The Shrine of St. Ursula is a carved and gilded wooden reliquary containing oil on panel inserts (87x33x91 cm) by Hans Memling. Dating to c. 1489, it is housed in the Hans Memling Museum in the Old St. John's Hospital (Sint-Janshospitaal), Bruges, in the Flemish Region of modern-day Belgium.

The work was commissioned by the Hospital of St. John, the current museum's seat. Differently from other works by Memling, such as the Triptych of the Mystical Marriage of St. Catherine or the Florens Triptych, it is neither signed nor dated. The relics were solemnly put in the shrine on 21 November 1489.

Description
The shrine is in the shape of a Gothic chapel, according to a customary format used in goldsmithing. It has a steeply pointed cover, as typical of northern European countries, with three painted tondoes on each side. Attributed to Memling's workshop, they depict, on one side, the First Eleven Virgins with the Pope, a Cardinal, a Bishop and Etherius (characters of the saint's legend); on the other side, the Coronation of the Virgin with the Holy Trinity.

The two "façades" contain the representations of the Virgin and Child between Two Nuns (the two donors, including the abbess), and St. Ursula Protecting the Holy Virgins. Both the scenes are embedded within a painted niche which simulates  a perspective interior of the shrine.

At the sides, under two small arcades, are six scenes of the life and martyrdom of St. Ursula, which resemble the style of the stained glasses in contemporary churches. They  include:Arrival in CologneArrival in BaselArrival in RomeLeaving from BaselMartyrdom of the PilgrimsMartyrdom of St. Ursula''

The scenes share the same pictorial background, set in  northern German cities (such as Cologne, with the unfinished Cathedral) and painted with great attention to today's life details.

The decoration is completed by the carvings in International Gothic style, including pinnacles, holed friezes and, on the piers  at the corners,  the saints James, John the Evangelist, Agnes and Elizabeth of Hungary.

Sources

External links
 site presenting the text of the legend of St. Ursula by Jacobus da Varagine and scenes of the St. Ursula shrine painted by Hans Memling (recent pictures)

Paintings by Hans Memling
1489 paintings
Paintings in the Old St. John's Hospital
Christian reliquaries
Paintings of the Madonna and Child
Paintings of Saint Ursula